The Twisted Thing (1966) is Mickey Spillane's ninth novel featuring private investigator Mike Hammer.

Spillane claimed it was based on a true story and he submitted it as the second Mike Hammer novel but it was rejected by his publisher's editor.

Notes

1966 American novels
Novels by Mickey Spillane
E. P. Dutton books
Mike Hammer (character) novels